Norbert Morin (born December 16, 1945) is a Canadian politician in the province of Quebec. He is a member of the Quebec Liberal Party and is the member of the National Assembly of Quebec for Côte-du-Sud electoral district.

He was first elected to represent the riding of Montmagny-L'Islet in the National Assembly of Quebec in the 2003 provincial election, but was defeated in the 2007 provincial election by Claude Roy of the Action démocratique du Québec. He was subsequently re-elected in the 2008 provincial election. Montmagny-L'Islet ceased to exist in the 2012 election, and Morin ran and won in the newly created Côte-du-Sud.

Prior to his election, Morin was a municipal councilor from 1974 to 2002 for the municipality of Saint-François-de-la-Rivière-du-Sud and was mayor for the town in 2003 and in 2007. He was an administrative member for a local Desjardins bank, the Montmagny CLSC and CHSLD as well as the local tourism office. He was also president for the public safety committee and an administrator of the local development center of the Montmagny Regional County Municipality. He is also the owner of a meat shop since 1990.

During his first term, Morin was the parliamentary assistant to the Minister of Wildlife and Parks.

External links
 

Living people
1945 births
Quebec Liberal Party MNAs
Mayors of places in Quebec
21st-century Canadian politicians